Alan Arnell (25 November 1933 – 5 May 2013) was an English footballer who played as a centre forward in the 1950s and 1960s. He played for Liverpool, Tranmere Rovers and Halifax Town.

Playing career
Arnell was born in Chichester and started out as an amateur player for Worthing before joining Liverpool in March 1953. He turned professional the following year.

Arnell  made a scoring debut for Liverpool at centre forward in a 5–2 win against Blackpool in December 1953. After 35 goals in 75 appearances for Liverpool, he moved to Tranmere Rovers in February 1961.

At Tranmere, he scored 34 times in 68 League games, and he later played for Halifax Town and Runcorn.

Death
Arnell died on 5 May 2013, aged 79.

References

English Football League players
Association football forwards
Worthing F.C. players
Liverpool F.C. players
Tranmere Rovers F.C. players
Halifax Town A.F.C. players
Runcorn F.C. Halton players
1933 births
2013 deaths
Sportspeople from Chichester
English footballers